Ira Rubin (1930 – February 6, 2013) was an American professional contract bridge player. Rubin attended the Bronx High School of Science and later New York University. Rubin lived in Fair Lawn and resided in nearby Paramus for 35 years.

Rubin learned to play bridge as a boy in the 1930s, from German-speaking refugees at Lake Placid, which he visited with his mother, who was not a player. At age nine, he and friends made up bidding conventions. He started to play tournament bridge when he was in high school, and in his thirties became a full-time player, which he was able to pursue because of his wife's income from her occupation in speech pathology.  Known as "the Beast" for his intense style of playing, he invented several bidding systems in the game of bridge. He won 23 contract bridge titles, including the Bermuda Bowl in 1976.

Rubin died, aged 82, survived by three children and four grandchildren. He is buried at Mount Moriah Cemetery in Fairview, Bergen County, New Jersey.

Rubin was inducted into the ACBL Hall of Fame in 2000.

Bridge accomplishments

Honors
 ACBL Hall of Fame, 2000

Awards
 Fishbein Trophy (2) 1959, 1962
 Herman Trophy (1) 1970

Wins
 Bermuda Bowl (1) 1976 
 North American Bridge Championships (19)
 von Zedtwitz Life Master Pairs (1) 1962 
 Wernher Open Pairs (3) 1958, 1961, 1962 
 Blue Ribbon Pairs (1) 1970 
 Open Pairs (1928-1962) (1) 1961 
 Jacoby Open Swiss Teams (1) 1983 
 Vanderbilt (2) 1965, 1966 
 Reisinger (5) 1969, 1974, 1975, 1978, 1979 
 Spingold (5) 1956, 1959, 1966, 1979, 1985

Runners-up
 Bermuda Bowl (2) 1966, 1977 
 North American Bridge Championships
 von Zedtwitz Life Master Pairs (3) 1954, 1955, 1963 
 Wernher Open Pairs (1) 1955 
 Truscott Senior Swiss Teams (1) 2004 
 Vanderbilt (4) 1968, 1969, 1971, 1981 
 Mitchell Board-a-Match Teams (2) 1976, 1980 
 Chicago Mixed Board-a-Match (1) 1957 
 Reisinger (1) 1965 
 Spingold (2) 1957, 1969

See also
 List of Bronx High School of Science alumni
 List of contract bridge people

References

External links
 
 

1930 births
2013 deaths
American contract bridge players
Bermuda Bowl players
The Bronx High School of Science alumni
New York University alumni
People from Fair Lawn, New Jersey
People from Paramus, New Jersey
20th-century American Jews
Burials in New Jersey
21st-century American Jews
Burials at Mount Moriah Cemetery (Fairview, New Jersey)